Giuseppe Olgiati (10 December 1660 – 29 July 1736) was a Roman Catholic prelate who served as Bishop of Como (1711–1735)
and Bishop of Parma (1694–1711).

Biography
Giuseppe Olgiati was born in Milan, Italy on 10 December 1660.
He was ordained a deacon on 7 June 1693 and ordained a priest on 17 June 1693.
On 8 November 1694, he was appointed during the papacy of Pope Innocent XII as Bishop of Parma.
On 21 November 1694, he was consecrated bishop by Gasparo Carpegna, Cardinal-Priest of Santa Maria in Trastevere. 
On 26 January 1711, he was appointed during the papacy of Pope Clement XI as Bishop of Como.
He served as Bishop of Como until his resignation on 23 September 1735.
He died on 29 July 1736.

Episcopal succession
While bishop, he was the principal co-consecrator of:
Carlo Ottaviano Guasco, Bishop of Alessandria della Paglia (1695);
Alessandro Roncovieri, Bishop of Borgo San Donnino (1700);
Paolo Andrea Borelli, Bishop of Noli (1700); and
Bernardino Pecci, Bishop of Grosseto (1710).

References

External links and additional sources
 (for Chronology of Bishops) 
 (for Chronology of Bishops) 
 (for Chronology of Bishops) 
 (for Chronology of Bishops) 

17th-century Italian Roman Catholic bishops
18th-century Italian Roman Catholic bishops
Bishops appointed by Pope Innocent XII
Bishops appointed by Pope Clement XI
1660 births
1736 deaths